Danylchenko, also transliterated as Danilchenko or Daniltchenko, is a Ukrainian surname. Notable people with the surname include:

Galina Danilchenko (born 1964), Ukrainian accountant and politician 
Jason Daniltchenko (born 1975), Australian rules footballer 
Serhiy Danylchenko (born 1974), Ukrainian boxer
Victoria Danilchenko (born 1969), Russian lawyer and TV presenter
Vitaliy Danylchenko (born 1978), Ukrainian figure skater

See also
 
 

Ukrainian-language surnames